The European Journal of Political Research (EJPR) is a major journal of European political science sponsored by the European Consortium for Political Research (ECPR). It is one of the most highly respected journals in the discipline, and the first journal of the ECPR.

The EJPR specialises in articles articulating theoretical and comparative perspectives in political science, covering quantitative and qualitative approaches. All articles are subject to anonymised peer review. The Journal is currently edited by Isabelle Engeli (University of Exeter), Emiliano Grossman (Sciences Po Paris / CEE) and Sofia Vassilopoulou (University of York).

Ranking
According to the Journal Citation Reports, the journal has a 2015 impact factor of 2.525, ranking it 9th out of 163 journals in the category "Political Science". In 2008 and 2014, it was ranked by the SCImago Journal Rank 48th and 26th, respectively in the Sociology and Political Science category.

See also 
 List of political science journals

References

Political science journals
Wiley-Blackwell academic journals
Academic journals associated with international learned and professional societies of Europe